Baidyanath Ram is an Indian politician and he was member of the Bharatiya Janata Party. Ram is a member of the Jharkhand Legislative Assembly from the Latehar constituency in Latehar district. On 10 November 2019, he joined Jharkhand Mukti Morcha Party due to his name removed by BJP for  2019 Jharkhand Vidhan Sabha Election Candidate.

References 

Year of birth missing (living people)
Living people
People from Latehar district
Bharatiya Janata Party politicians from Jharkhand
Jharkhand MLAs 2009–2014
Jharkhand MLAs 2019–2024
Jharkhand Mukti Morcha politicians